Hermann Müller (18 May 1876 – 20 March 1931) was a German Social Democratic politician who served as the Foreign minister (1919–1920), and twice as the Chancellor of Germany (1920, 1928–1930) in the Weimar Republic. In his capacity as Foreign Minister, he was one of the German signatories of the Treaty of Versailles (28 June 1919).

Early life
Hermann Müller was born on 18 May 1876 in Mannheim, the son of Georg Jakob Müller (born 1843), a producer of sparkling wine and wine dealer from Güdingen near Saarbrücken, and his wife Karoline (née Vogt, born 1849, died after 1931), originally from Frankfurt am Main. Müller attended the Realgymnasium at Mannheim and after his father moved to Niederlößnitz in 1888 at Dresden. After his father died in 1892, Müller had to leave school due to financial difficulties and began an apprenticeship (kaufmännische Lehre) at Frankfurt. He worked in Frankfurt and Breslau, and in 1893 joined the Social Democratic Party of Germany (SPD). Hermann Müller, a Social Democrat heavily influenced by his father, an advocate of Ludwig Feuerbach's views, is the only German chancellor who was not a member of any religion.

Political career

Before 1918
From 1899 to 1906, Müller worked as an editor at the Socialist newspaper Görlitzer Volkswacht. He was member of the local parliament (Stadtverordneter, 1903 to 1906) and a party functionary (Unterbezirksvorsitzender). August Bebel nominated him in 1905 (without success) and 1906 (successfully) for membership of the board of the national SPD.
At that time, Müller changed from a left-wing Social Democrat to a "centrist", who argued against both the "revisionists" and against the radical left around Rosa Luxemburg.
Together with Friedrich Ebert, Müller succeeded in 1909 in creating the Parteiausschuss that was to deal with internal arguments in between the party conventions. Known for his calm, industriousness, integrity, and rationality, Müller lacked charisma. In 1909, he tried but failed to prevent Otto Braun's election to the board, laying the foundation for a long-running animosity between the two.

As a result of his foreign language skills, Müller was the representative of the SPD at the Second International and at the conventions of socialist parties in other countries in western Europe. In late July 1914, Müller was sent to Paris to negotiate with the French socialists over a common stance towards the respective countries' war loan proposals. No agreement was reached, however, and before Müller was able to report back, the SPD had already decided to support the first war loans in the Reichstag.

During World War I, Müller supported the Burgfrieden. He was used by the SPD leadership to deal with arguments with the party's left wing and as an in-house censor for the party newspaper Vorwärts to avoid an outright ban by the military authorities. Müller was close to the group around Eduard David and supported both the Treaty of Brest-Litovsk with Russia and the entry of the SPD into the government of Max von Baden in October 1918.

First elected in a by-election in 1916, Müller was a member of the Reichstag until 1918.

1918 to 1920
In the German Revolution of 1918-19, Müller was a member of the Greater Berlin executive council (Vollzugsrat der Arbeiter- und Soldatenräte) where he represented the position of the SPD leadership, arguing in favor of elections to the Weimar National Assembly. He later published a book on his experience during the revolution.

In January 1919, Müller was elected to the National Assembly. In February 1919, Ebert became President of Germany and appointed Philipp Scheidemann as Ministerpräsident (head of government). These two had been the joint chairmen of the SPD and now replacements had to be found. Müller and Otto Wels were elected with 373 and 291 out of 376 votes, respectively. Wels focused on internal leadership and organization, whilst Müller was the external representative of the party. In 1919 and 1920–28, Müller was also leader of the parliamentary fraction (Fraktionsvorsitzender ) in the National Assembly and then the Reichstag. He was nominated as the chairman of the Reichstag's Committee on Foreign Affairs. After 1920, he was a candidate for the Reichstag for Franconia and changed his name to Müller-Franken, to distinguish himself from other members named Müller.

After Scheidemann resigned in June 1919, Müller was asked to succeed him as head of government but declined. Under the new Ministerpräsident and later Chancellor Gustav Bauer, Müller became Reichsaußenminister (Foreign Minister) on 21 June 1919. In this capacity, he went to Versailles and with Colonial Minister Johannes Bell signed the Treaty of Versailles for Germany on 29 June 1919.

After the resignation of the Bauer cabinet, which followe the Kapp-Lüttwitz Putsch in March 1920, Müller accepted Ebert's offer of becoming Chancellor and formed a new government. Under his leadership, the government suppressed the left-wing uprisings like that in the Ruhr area and urged the disarmament of paramilitary Einwohnerwehren demanded by the Allies. The newly created second Sozialisierungskommission  (commission on socialization) admitted some members from the left-wing USPD because Müller felt that only that way would the workers be willing to accept the commission's decisions. In social policy, Müller's time as Chancellor saw the passage of a number of progressive social reforms. A comprehensive war-disability system was established in May 1920, while the Law on the Employment of the Disabled of April 1920 stipulated that all public and private employers with more than 20 employees were obligated to hire Germans disabled by accident or war and with at least a 50% reduction in their ability to work. The Basic School Law (passed on 28 April 1920) introduced a common four-year course in primary schools for all German children. Benefits for the unemployed were improved, with the maximum benefit for single males over the age of 21 increased from 5 to 8 marks in May 1920. In May 1920, maximum scales that were established way back in April 1919 were increased.

On 29 March 1920 the Reichstag passed a Reich income-tax law, together with a law on corporate tax and a capital-yield tax. The Salary Reform Act, passed in April 1920, greatly improved the pay of civil servants. In May 1920, the Reich office for Labour Allocation was set up as the first Reich-wide institution "to allocate labor, administer unemployment insurance and generally manage labor concerns". The Reich Insurance Code of May 1920 provided war-wounded persons and dependent survivors with therapeutic treatment and social welfare which had the objective of reintegrating handicapped persons into working life. The Cripples' Welfare Act, passed that same month, made it a duty of the public welfare system to assist cripples under the age of 18 to obtain the capacity to earn an income. The Reich Homestead Act, passed in May 1920, sought to encourage homesteading as a means of helping economically vulnerable groups. The Reich Tenant Protection Order of 9 June 1920 sought to check evictions and "an immoderate increase of rental rates", authorising the Laender to set up tenancy offices, made up of tenants and owners' representatives, with a judge as chairman to settle disputes concerning rents. As noted by Frieda Wunderlich, they were entitled "to supervise the fixing of rents for all farms". During Müller's last year in office, a number of Orders were introduced that "confirmed and defined the protective measures taken in connection with the employment of women in certain work of a particularly dangerous or arduous nature," which included work in glass-works, rolling mills, and iron foundries (through Orders of 26 March 1930).

Müller was Chancellor only until June 1920, when the outcome of the general elections to the Reichstag resulted in the formation of a new government led by Constantin Fehrenbach of the Zentrum. The SPD suffered a defeat at the polls, with the number of people voting for them almost dropping by half compared to the January 1919 election. Discouraged, Müller only half-heartedly negotiated with the USPD about a coalition. However, he was turned down anyway, as the USPD was unwilling to join any coalition including non-socialist parties and one in which the USPD was not the majority party. On the other side of the political spectrum, Müller was opposed to working with Gustav Stresemann's German People's Party (DVP), considering them a mouthpiece for corporate interests and doubting their loyalty to the republican constitution.

1920 to 1928
The SPD now was in the opposition regarding the domestic agenda of the new government while supporting its foreign policy, in particular regarding reparations to the Allies. Müller was an early advocate of joining the League of Nations and of moving politically closer to the West. He was critical of the Soviet Union's authoritarian system of government, its revolutionary goals, and its support for the radical left in Germany. However, he opposed a blockade of the Soviet Union by the western Allies.

Initially, Müller favoured diplomatic relations with the Soviets only as far as they would help in preventing integration of Upper Silesia into the new Polish state. He viewed the Treaty of Rapallo (1922) as a true peace treaty, but one that only had meaning within the context of a successful diplomatic policy towards the western powers, not as an alternative to it. Müller warned against attaching too much hope to the potential economic gains from the treaty, arguing that only the US would be in a position to provide effective aid for the economic reconstruction of post-World War I Europe.

During the period in office of the governments led by Joseph Wirth in 1921/22 and in which the SPD participated, Müller demanded as parliamentary leader of the SPD that budget consolidation would involve first and foremost the higher taxation of wealth rather than of consumption. This led to confrontations with the "bourgeois" parties. Similarly, the reunification of SPD and USPD resulted in a move to the left of the new SPD. Arguments between SPD and DVP about economic issues like the eight-hour work day introduced in late 1918 (but opposed by the DVP) finally caused the coalition's end in November 1922.

Recognizing a national emergency when the French seized the Ruhr and inflation spiraled out of control in 1923, Müller was ready to enter into a "Grand Coalition" led by Gustav Stresemann (August to November 1923). However, differences in economic and social policies strained relations between the SPD and the other members of the coalition. Müller did support the emergency measures taken after October 1923, but the biased way the Reich government dealt with the socialist provincial governments in Thuringia and Saxony on the one hand, and the right-wing regime in Bavaria on the other, caused the SPD to leave the coalition in November 1923.

At the party convention in 1924, Müller said that the SPD's stance towards coalitions was less based on principles than on tactics. The goal was to supply a Reichstag majority for the foreign policy that the Social Democrats thought was right. Although they were in the opposition, the SPD supported a policy of reconciliation with the western powers (as exemplified by the Locarno Treaties and entry to the League of Nations). In late 1926, another "Grand Coalition" seemed likely, but was scuppered by intrigues from inside the Defense Ministry and by the right wing of the DVP.

After 1928

In 1928, Prussian Ministerpräsident Otto Braun said that he was not interested in becoming Chancellor. When the SPD turned out to be the clear winner of the May 1928 elections, the Social Democrats thus designated Müller as Chancellor. However, the other parties proved reluctant to compromise and it took a personal intervention by Stresemann for a government to be formed on 28 June 1928. The coalition (of Social Democrats, Zentrum, DDP, and DVP) only managed to settle on a written agreement on the government's policies in spring 1929. In particular, domestic policy differences between SPD and DVP dominated the government's work. Its continued existence was mainly due to the mutual personal esteem between Müller and Foreign Minister Stresemann. Relations between the parties were strained by the arguments over construction of Panzerkreuzer A, during which the SPD forced its ministers to vote against the allocation of funds to the project in the Reichstag although they had endorsed it in cabinet meetings. In addition, the Ruhreisenstreit was a bone of contention, as the DVP refused to provide financial support even to those only indirectly affected by the strike. Financing the budget for 1929 and the external liabilities of the Reich was a huge problem, and an agreement was only possible by counting on negotiating more lenient conditions with the Allies. Müller himself had been the leader of the delegation to the League of Nations in the summer of 1928 where he—despite a heated argument with French Foreign Minister Aristide Briand over German rearmament—had laid the groundwork for concessions by the Allies. By January 1930, the government had succeeded in negotiating a reduction in reparation payments (the Young Plan, signed in August 1929) and a promise by the Allies to completely remove the occupation forces from the Rhineland by May 1930.

Meanwhile, Müller's cabinet also had to deal with diplomatic problems with Poland over trade and ethnic minority questions. German-Soviet relations also reached a nadir, as the Soviet government blamed the cabinet for violence between Communist demonstrators and the police in Berlin in May 1929. At that point, the bourgeois parties were looking for ways to end the coalition with the SPD. There were attempts  to stop the Young Plan via a referendum and the coalition parties disagreed on the issue of unemployment insurance. Müller himself was unable to participate in the political arena for several months due to a life-threatening illness.

Although Müller was able to resume his duties in the fall of 1929, he was physically weakened and unable to control the centrifugal forces at work. The coalition finally fell apart in a disagreement about budgetary issues. After the onset of the Great Depression, the unemployment insurance required an injection of taxpayer money by the Reich, but the parties could not agree on how to raise the funds. Müller was willing to accept a compromise offer by Heinrich Brüning of the Zentrum, but he was overruled by the SPD parliamentary group which refused to make any further concessions. On the suggestion of his advisors, Reichspräsident Paul von Hindenburg refused to provide Müller's government with the emergency powers of Article 48, forcing Müller to resign on 27 March 1930.

Nevertheless, a number of progressive reforms were implemented under Müller's last government. In 1928, nationwide state-controlled unemployment insurance was established, and midwives and people in the music profession became compulsorily insured under a pension scheme for non-manual workers in 1929. In February 1929, accident insurance coverage was extended to include 22 occupationally induced diseases. That same year, a special pension for unemployed persons at the age of 60 was introduced.

Death

After resigning as Chancellor, Müller retired from public life. After the elections in September 1930 which saw massive gains for Adolf Hitler's NSDAP, Müller called on his party to support Brüning's government even without being part of the coalition. His death in 1931 following a gallbladder operation was seen as a major blow to the Social Democrats. He died in Berlin and is buried there at the Zentralfriedhof Friedrichsfelde.

Family
In 1902, Müller married Frieda Tockus. They had one daughter, Annemarie, in 1905. However, Tockus died several weeks later, due to complications from the pregnancy. He remarried in 1909 to Gottliebe Jaeger, and the following year his daughter Erika was born.

Cabinet June 1928 – March 1930

Hermann Müller (SPD) – Chancellor
Dr. Gustav Stresemann (DVP) – Minister of Foreign Affairs
Carl Severing (SPD) – Minister of the Interior
Dr. Erich Koch-Weser (DDP) – Minister of Justice
Dr. Rudolf Hilferding (SPD) – Minister of Finance
Dr. Paul Moldenhauer (DVP) – Minister of Finance from 1929
Dr. Julius Curtius (DVP) – Minister of Economics
Dr. Hermann Dietrich (DDP) – Minister of Food
Rudolf Wissell (SPD) – Minister of Labour
Wilhelm Groener – Minister of Defence
Theodor von Guérard (Centre Party) – Minister of Transport and Occupied Territories
Georg Schätzel (BVP) – Postal Minister

Changes
6 February 1929 – Schätzel succeeds von Guérard as Transportation Minister. Schätzel remains Postal Minister. Severing succeeds von Guérard as Occupied Territories Minister. Severing remains Interior Minister.
13 April 1929 – Von Guérard succeeds Koch-Weser as Justice Minister. Adam Stegerwald (Z) succeeds Schätzel as Transportation Minister. Schätzel remains Postal Minister. Joseph Wirth (Z) succeeds Severing as Occupied Territories Minister. Severing remains Interior Minister.
3 October 1929 – Stresemann dies. Curtius succeeds him as Foreign Minister.
11 November 1929 – Dr. Paul Moldenhauer (DVP) succeeds Curtius as Economics Minister. Curtius remains Foreign Minister.
21 December 1929 – Hilferding resigns as Finance Minister.
23 December 1929 – Moldenhauer becomes Finance Minister. Robert Schmidt (SPD) succeeds him as Economics Minister.

Works
 Die Novemberrevolution - Erinnerungen. Der Bücherkreis, Berlin 1928.

Literature
 
 Prager, Eugen: "Hermann Müller und die Presse". In: Mitteilungen des Vereins Arbeiterpresse. Heft 312 (April 1931), p. 1–2.
 Behring, Rainer: "Wegbereiter sozialdemokratischer Außenpolitik. Hermann Müller". In: Frankfurter Allgemeine Zeitung. 26. April 2006, p. 8.
 Braun, Bernd: Die Reichskanzler der Weimarer Republik. Zwölf Lebensläufe in Bildern. Düsseldorf, 2011, p. 134–167.

References

External links
 

1876 births
1931 deaths
20th-century Chancellors of Germany
Politicians from Mannheim
People from the Grand Duchy of Baden
Social Democratic Party of Germany politicians
Chancellors of Germany
Foreign Ministers of Germany
Members of the 13th Reichstag of the German Empire
Members of the Weimar National Assembly
Members of the Reichstag of the Weimar Republic
Reichsbanner Schwarz-Rot-Gold members
Members of the Executive of the Labour and Socialist International
German anti-communists